Ordu Yardımlaşma Kurumu (OYAK) (lit. Military Mutual Aid Institution), is a Turkish charity and pension fund with around 363,000 members and owner of Renault (Oyak). The OYAK Holding Investment Subsidiary Group is one of the largest industrial groups in Turkey. The group was the former owner of ING Oyak Bank (sold to ING Bank in 2007) and the Oypa supermarket chain. In 2012, it was rated BB+/stable by Standard & Poor's. The group co-owns Oyak-Renault, a car manufacturer, and steel producer Erdemir. OYAK Group of Companies added Sagra to its structure in April 2021.

OYAK provides members with "supplementary retirement benefits" apart from the official retirement fund, T.C.Emekli Sandığı/SSK, to which they are primarily affiliated. In addition to retirement benefits, OYAK pays disability benefits to members when they become partially or fully disabled, and provides death benefits to the deceased's heirs.

OYAK is a private entity that is subject to Turkish civic and commercial law. OYAK, also offers services such as consumer loans, housing loans, pension system, stock market investment support to its members.

OYAK is on the global coal exit list published by Urgewald because it owns İsken Sugözü power station.

Structure

OYAK Group companies
In the industrial sector, the OYAK Group 's companies include iron and steel, chemistry, cement manufacturing, electricity and automotive.

 OYAK Mining Metallurgy Group
 OYAK Cement Concrete Paper Group
 OYAK Automotive Logistics Group
 OYAK Finance Group
 OYAK Service Group
 OYAK Chemical Group
 OYAK Agricultural Livestock Group
 OYAK Energy Group

Affiliated companies
Affiliated companies and investments include:
 OYAK Construction (Oyak Insaat), founded 1982, in Turkey
 OYAK Yatirim Ortakligi AS (investment company, part-floated on the Istanbul Stock Exchange as OYAYO.IS)
 Oyak-Renault (49%)
 OYAK Securities (Oyak Yatirim), founded 1982
 Erdemir (steel), acquired in 2005
 Opet (Oyak Petrolleri), founded 1992

Subsidiary companies
 OMSAN Lojistik AŞ; A logistics company founded in 1978 as a subsidiary of OYAK. It has subsidiaries in France, Romania, Morocco, and a company named OMFESA in Spain. It has approximately 240 personnel, and a fleet consisting of 871 vehicles.

References

External links
www.oyak.com.tr
Military-Economic Structure in Turkey: Present Situation, Problems, and Solutions, İsmet Akça, TESEV, July 2010. 
 The Turkish Aid and Institution Law, passed in 1961.

Public pension funds
Ministry of National Defense (Turkey)
Turkish companies established in 1961
Financial services companies established in 1961
Companies based in Ankara
Government-owned companies of Turkey
Transport companies of Turkey
Coal companies of Turkey